WAFT is a Christian radio station licensed to Valdosta, Georgia, broadcasting on 101.1 MHz FM.  The station serves the areas of Valdosta, Georgia, Thomasville, Georgia, and Moultrie, Georgia, as well as Jefferson, Madison, and Hamilton Counties in Florida. WAFT is owned by Christian Radio Fellowship, Inc.

WAFT airs a variety of Christian Talk and Teaching programs as well as Christian music. Programs heard on WAFT include; Grace to You with John MacArthur, Revive our Hearts with Nancy Leigh DeMoss, Thru the Bible with J. Vernon McGee, Insight for Living with Chuck Swindoll, Love Worth Finding with Adrian Rogers, In Touch with Charles Stanley, Turning Point with David Jeremiah, Truth for Life with Alistair Begg, Focus on the Family, and Joni and Friends.

References

External links
WAFT's official website

AFT
AFT
Radio stations established in 1971